The Voice Teens is a Philippine reality television singing competition for teenagers that airs on ABS-CBN. It is a spin-off of the Dutch reality singing competition The Voice; compared to adults' version, this reiteration was conceptualized for teens. The coaches and judges of the Philippine show are Lea Salonga, Bamboo Mañalac, Sharon Cuneta, Sarah Geronimo and apl.de.ap.

This is the third version of The Voice Philippine franchise, after The Voice of the Philippines and The Voice Kids; this is also the second The Voice Teens franchise in the world (after Colombia) and the first in Asia. It aired from April 16, 2017 to August 16, 2020, replacing Your Face Sounds Familiar Kids. The show is final hosted by Alex Gonzaga and Luis Manzano.

Overview
As a spinoff of The Voice of the Philippines, the show shares numerous elements from its parent show.

Format
The Voice Teens is a reality television series, a spin-off version of The Voice format that first aired in the Netherlands, that was first adapted in Colombia through La Voz Teens. The original Colombian format features three coaches. The Philippine format features four coaches or judges searching for a batch of talented individuals who could become the Philippines' new teen singing superstar. The show's concept is indicated by its title: the four coaches will only judge a singer hopeful termed by the show as "Artist" with only his/her vocal talent without prejudice to his/her physical bearing.

It's with this concept that makes The Voice franchise rise above other known reality talent searches which airs in any known media platform such as The X Factor franchise, the Got Talent franchise or even the Idol franchise. The lucky Artists who have advanced from the audition round would be split into four teams, whom are mentored by four well-known personalities in terms of singing which in the show, termed "coaches" who in turn would collaborate with them and choose songs for their artists to perform.

On-ground and the producers' auditions
As for any "The Voice" franchise, the first stage is the producers' auditions, which are not shown on television. In The Voice Teens, ABS-CBN headed by their regional partners nationwide and abroad are tasked to conduct the "Unseen Auditions." At this stage, there will be different judges that will use the power of media to conduct three types of screening; radio auditions, online auditions and on-ground auditions where the team will travel in and out of the country to find the best of the best to participate in the next set of auditions, "The Blind Auditions."

Blind auditions
The first televised stage is the blind auditions, where artists will be given a minimum of 90 seconds to sing their audition piece. The official coaches of the show will be sitting on a chair facing away from the stage and artist. The coaches will only judge by the power, clarity, type and uniqueness of the artists singing capability. If they like what they hear and want to mentor the artist for the next stage, they will push a button on their chair that would turn the chair around to face the artists for the first time. This concept was created to avoid any due prejudice of their physical bearing and life-story. If a coach turns for an artist, that artist will be included in his/her team. If more than one coach turns around, the choice to pick a who will he/she be mentored goes to the artist. If no coach turns his/her chair the auditioning artist's journey ends. At the end, each of the coaches will have a certain number of artists in his or her team who will be advancing to the next round.

A new addition in this version is the Blind Blinds, where the stage is covered with a curtain and will only be dropped to reveal the artist after his or her performance.

In the second season, the Block buttons were introduced; in the said new twist, a coach can push any of the three block buttons designated to block a certain coach. In effect, the coach being blocked will not be able to be chosen by the artist he or she had turned to. Each coach is only eligible to do two blocks in the entire phase of this competition.

The Battles
The next stage called "The Battles," is where a coach will build from his or her team pairs of 2. A pair will be given a single song to sing together. They are mentored and developed by their respective coach in the process. A vocal showdown will commence in the Battle stage where only the artist whom the coach deemed sung the song assigned better will advance to the next round.

The power to steal a losing artist from the other teams was implemented in the second season of The Voice of the Philippines, and this will be carried over in The Voice Teens. In this twist, a coach can steal two artists (one in Season 2) during the entire Battles.

The Knockouts
In the Knockouts, artists will be grouped into three. Each artist had to sing in order to convince their respective coach to pick them for the Live shows. Each artist will decide on what song they will sing. Only one artist will win in each group. At the end of this round, three artists per team will advance to the Live shows.

Live Shows
The next round known as the "Live Shows" is where the remaining artists per team perform in front the coaches, audience and live broadcast. An artist will be given a song to sing for a chance to advance to the next live show, and ultimately, the finals. The voting results are announced on the same night as the live shows. During the finals, the winner will only be decided upon by the public through different platforms. The most voted artist of the competition will be crowned as The Voice.

Development
The Blind auditions began filming four days in March 2017 at Studio 10 of ABS-CBN Broadcasting Center. The Voice Teens will fill the age gap of the two earlier versions of The Voice franchise, wherein the age requirement was limited from ages 15 to 17. Auditions were announced earlier in 2016 and were held in various key cities within the Philippines.

The Philippines is the second country in the world to adapt The Voice Teens franchise after its success in Colombia.

Coaches and hosts
On January 25, 2017, Lea Salonga first confirmed that she would be returning as a coach for the teen edition's first season, along with Bamboo Mañalac and Sharon Cuneta. This was the sixth time that Salonga teamed up with Mañalac and the second time with Cuneta. Salonga's announcement sparked speculation as to whether the fourth coach would be Sarah Geronimo, who was with Salonga and Mañalac in the adults' and kids' version. Geronimo would go on to return to be a coach after taking a break in the third kids season.

The second season saw a change in the roster of coaches. Cuneta exited the panel; she was replaced with apl.de.ap, who last appeared in the second regular season.

Hosts 
Toni Gonzaga and Luis Manzano served as presenters in the first season; meanwhile Robi Domingo hosted the show's online companion show on Facebook. Gonzaga left the show in the second season, being replaced with her sister, Alex.

Season summary
Artist's info

Teams
Contestant placing

Winners are in bold, finalists are in small italic font, and the eliminated artists are in small font.

Reception

Television ratings
Television ratings for The Voice Teens on ABS-CBN are gathered from two major sources, namely from AGB Nielsen and Kantar Media. AGB Nielsen's survey ratings are gathered from 2,000 households based on urban areas only while Kantar Media's survey ratings are gathered from all over the Philippines' 2,610 urban and rural households representing a 100% of the viewership population.

At the end of 2017, based on the data gathered by Kantar Media, The Voice Teens was the third most watched show in the year after gaining an average audience TV rating of 34.4%.

Awards

External links

Official website
 The Voice Teens on ABS-CBN

Social Networks
 The Voice Teens on Facebook
 The Voice Teens on Twitter
 The Voice Teens on Instagram
 The Voice Teens on YouTube

See also
 List of programs broadcast by ABS-CBN

References

 
The Voice of the Philippines
2017 Philippine television series debuts
2020 Philippine television series endings
2010s Philippine television series
2020s Philippine television series
Philippine television series based on Dutch television series
ABS-CBN original programming
Philippine reality television series
Filipino-language television shows
Television series about teenagers
Reality television spin-offs